The 2004–05 Major Indoor Soccer League season was the fourth season for the league.  The regular season started on October 9, 2004, and ended on April 24, 2005.

League standings

Playoffs

Scoring leaders
GP = Games Played, G = Goals, A = Assists, Pts = Points

Source:

League awards
 Most Valuable Player: Greg Howes, Milwaukee
 Defender of the Year: Pat Morris, Philadelphia
 Rookie of the Year: John Barry Nusum, Philadelphia
 Goalkeeper of the Year: Pete Pappas, Philadelphia
 Coach of the Year: Omid Namazi, Cleveland
 Championship Series Finals MVP: Todd Dusosky, Milwaukee

Sources:

All-MISL Teams

Source:

All-Rookie Team

Source:

References

External links
Major Indoor Soccer League II (RSSSF)

Major Indoor Soccer League (2001–2008)
2004 in American soccer leagues
2005 in American soccer leagues
2004–05